The problem of neutrino mass hierarchy is related to the fact that present experimental data on neutrino oscillations allow two possible classes of solutions.

In the first class, called Normal Hierarchy (NH) or Normal Ordering (NO), the two lightest mass eigenstates have a small mass difference, of the order of 10 meV, while the third eigenstate has a mass about 50 meV higher. In the Inverted Hierarchy (IH), also called Inverted Ordering (IO), the lightest mass eigenstate is followed by a doublet of higher mass eigenstates about 50 meV heavier, being again of about 10 meV the mass difference in the doublet. Present data slightly prefer the NO.

References

Neutrino experiments
Neutrinos